Santa Luzia Dam is a concrete arch dam on the Unhais, a northern tributary of the Zêzere River, located in the municipality Pampilhosa da Serra, in Coimbra District, Portugal. The dam was constructed between 1930 and 1942 and was designed by André Coyne.

Design
Santa Luzia Dam is a 76 m tall and 115 m long arch dam. The volume of the dam is 80.000 m³. The dam contains 2 crest spillways  and one bottom outlet. At full reservoir level the reservoir of the dam has a surface area of 2.46 km² and its total capacity is 53.7 Mio m³.

The concrete of the dam is affected by concrete swelling, caused by an alkali–silica reaction, that leads to tensions and cracks in the concrete.

Power plant
The power plant is one of the smaller hydroelectric power stations in Portugal with a nameplate capacity of 32 MW. Its average annual generation is 55 Mio. kWh. The power station contains four Pelton turbine-generators.

See also

 List of power stations in Portugal

References

External links
 
 
 

Dams in Portugal
Hydroelectric power stations in Portugal
Arch dams
Dams completed in 1942
Energy infrastructure completed in 1942
1942 establishments in Portugal
Buildings and structures in Coimbra District